Room on Fire is the second studio album by American rock band the Strokes, released on October 28, 2003, through RCA Records. Its title is derived from a lyric in the song "Reptilia".

Room on Fire received positive reviews upon its release, and reached number four on the US Billboard 200 (where it went on to sell 597,000 units by October 2006 and was certified gold) and number two on the UK Albums Chart. Three singles were released from the album: "12:51", "Reptilia", and "The End Has No End".

Recording
Immediately after touring for their debut album Is This It, the Strokes returned to the studio. They hired Radiohead producer Nigel Godrich, but fired him when, according to the band, their work together proved "soulless". Godrich said of the failed collaboration: "The problem there was that me and [singer Julian Casablancas] are just too similar, we're both control freaks. He wanted to do it his way, I wanted to do it my way, and obviously that's the point of me being there. And I'm saying 'Well, why am I here if you're not prepared to try and do it the way I want to do it?' We got on great, it was just one of those laughable things where it just doesn't work. I wanted them to change, and they didn't."

Those sessions were ultimately scrapped and the band returned to their original producer, Gordon Raphael. The Strokes had exactly only three months of studio time to record the album. Guitarist Nick Valensi stated that "the album would've ended up a lot better if we'd had another couple of weeks."

Critical reception

Room On Fire received generally positive reviews from critics: on the review aggregating website Metacritic, it currently has a score of 77 out of 100 based on 31 reviews, which indicates "generally favorable reviews". However, in general, reviewers found the album too similar to Is This It. Rob Mitchum of Pitchfork gave the album an 8 out of 10, but stated that the band "have all but given birth to an identical twin." A positive review from Rolling Stone said that "the Strokes have resisted the temptation to hit the brakes, grow up and screw around with a sound that doesn't need fixing — yet." The review also stated that "if you want comfort and clarity, you're definitely in the wrong room. This record was built for thrills and speed." Dan Tallis of BBC Music gave it a favorable review and said, "Bands should think themselves lucky to achieve such heights just once in their careers. However, they've done all they could have done. They've made Is This It part two. It's more of the same plus extras. And I'm more than happy to settle for that."

Ben Thompson of The Observer gave it all five stars and said, "This is a feeling that can be inspired only by people making the absolute most of an opportunity to communicate: cutting through all the rubbish that surrounds them to make a clear and memorable artistic statement. And that the Strokes should have managed to do such a thing at this stage in their careers, is - I think - an achievement of real significance." Greg Milner of Spin gave it a score of eight out of ten and said that its "similarity to its predecessor ultimately bespeaks a purity of vision, not a dearth of new ideas." Jenny Tatone of Neumu gave it a score of nine stars out of ten and said, "The Strokes don't make the most original sounding music you've ever heard, but they make something that is only the Strokes." In his Consumer Guide, Robert Christgau gave the album a three-star honorable mention while picking out two songs from the album ("Between Love and Hate" and "What Ever Happened?") and stating simply, "Narcissism repeats itself."

Not all reviews were positive, however. Raoul Hernandez of The Austin Chronicle gave the album a score of two stars out of five and stated that "even the half-hearted retreads... cashing in on the notoriously unwashed NYC quintet's debut can't muster a wink." Iain Moffat of Playlouder gave the album only one star and said of the Strokes, "There's little of the pop sparkle that shone through the likes of 'The Modern Age' and 'Last Nite' even when - as with 'You Talk Way Too Much' - they're rewriting old material, and Julian's vocals are, to be blunt, awful, sounding uncomfortable to record and rather complacently nasal."

In 2013, Room On Fire was listed at number 360 on NMEs list of the 500 greatest albums of all time. In 2018, the BBC included it in their list of "the acclaimed albums that nobody listens to any more".

Reappraisal 
In 2021, Pitchfork included it on its list of album review scores they "would change if they could", upgrading its score from 8.0 out of 10 to 9.2. Lane Brown of Pitchfork praised as an album with a "different, better album with major improvements over its predecessor". Scoring a 0.1 bonus point more than Is This It, Room On Fire is commended in marking confident progress and "at least partially thwarting rock history's most inevitable backlash."

Commercial performance
The album peaked at number four on the Billboard 200 in the US, and was later certified Gold by the RIAA in December 2003, and platinum certification for selling over million units in June 2021.

Track listing

Personnel
The Strokes
 Julian Casablancas – vocals
 Albert Hammond, Jr. – guitar
 Nick Valensi – guitar
 Nikolai Fraiture – bass guitar
 Fabrizio Moretti – drums

Production
 Gordon Raphael – producer
 Toshikazu Yoshioka – head engineer
 William Kelly – second engineer
 Greg Calbi – mastering
 Steve Fallone – mastering
 J. P. Bowersock - "sensei"
 Ryan Gentles - management for Wiz Kid Management
 Steve Ralbovsky - A&R

Design
 Peter Phillips – cover art, ("War/Game", used with permission and courtesy of Zoe Phillips)
 Colin Lane – photography
 Brett Kilroe – art direction

Singles

Charts

Weekly charts

Year-end charts

Certifications

References

2003 albums
Albums produced by Gordon Raphael
RCA Records albums
Rough Trade Records albums
The Strokes albums